Arturo Arredondo, known by stage name Arthur White (born March 23, 1983) is a Mexican musician, composer, vocalist and  producer, best known as the guitarist and vocalist of the PANDA.

Biography 
Arturo Arredondo was born on March 23, 1983 in Monterrey. He was found of music from a very young age. At a very young age he formed a musical group called Super Asfalto but soon the group separated. He joined PANDA with the third album of the band Para ti con desprecio (2005), and stayed with the band till the last album Sangre Fría (2013).

After the PANDA group dispersed three members of the band Arturo Arredondo, Ricardo Treviño, and Jorge Vázquez formed Desierto Drive in 2019.

Albums 
Since his separation from PANDA he performs by his stage name Arthur White. In 2017 Arthur White released his first solo album, an EP called Ego Pop which consists of 6 songs and ranked number 1 on iTunes Mexico.

In 2018 he released his second album Somnofobia was released that has 6 songs.

Singles 
He occasionally releases singles on his YouTube channel that includes: Reflejos, Abnormal, Vicios, Fría Como El Viento.

Recently Arturo Arredondo and Ricky Treviño formed a company, Negro Pasión, for merchandising and to promote the local bands and music in Mexico and around America.

Awards and recognition 
He was nominated for the 50th Annual GRAMMY Awards for Best Latin Rock Or Alternative Album Amantes Sunt Amentes.

References

External links 

 Facebook
 Getty Images link

Mexican singers
Mexican guitarists
Panda (band) albums
Panda (band) songs
1983 births
Living people